Jose Thomas is an Indian film director in Malayalam movies. He directed more than 20 Malayalam movies. His popular movies are Mattupetti Machan, Kanjirapally Kariyachan, Udayapuram Sulthan, Mayamohini and Sringaravelan.

Filmography
Director

Acting
 Unnikuttanu Joli Kitti (1989)

References

External links
 

Malayalam film directors
Living people
Film directors from Thiruvananthapuram
20th-century Indian film directors
21st-century Indian film directors
Malayalam film producers
Malayalam screenwriters
Screenwriters from Thiruvananthapuram
Film producers from Thiruvananthapuram
1963 births